Charles Lawrence De'Ath (born 24 May 1968), also known as Charlie De'Ath, Charles De-Ath and Charles Death, is an English film and television actor.

Early life
De'Ath is the son of Wilfred De'Ath and was educated at Woolverstone Hall School from 1979 to 1984. (Woolverstone was a state-run (ILEA) boys' boarding school, near Ipswich in Suffolk. Woolverstone Hall is now the home of Ipswich High School for Girls, having been sold after the break-up of the Inner London Education Authority and the Greater London Council in the late 1980s.)

Selected filmography

References

External links
 

1968 births
English male film actors
English male television actors
Living people
People from Hampstead
Male actors from London
20th-century English male actors
21st-century English male actors